Las Manchas is a locality in the municipality of Santiago del Teide in the island of Tenerife.

Geography
Las Manchas is located at an average altitude of 980 meters above sea level and is located two kilometers from the municipal capital. It has a parish church dedicated to the Virgen del Pilar, a cultural center, a municipal sports center, a playground and a public square. Part of the locality is included in the Chinyero Nature Reserve.

References

Populated places in Tenerife